Xenotypa is a genus of fungi in the family Gnomoniaceae. This is a monotypic genus, containing the single species Xenotypa aterrima.

References

External links
Xenotypa at Index Fungorum

Gnomoniaceae
Monotypic Sordariomycetes genera